Cinq Cerf Bay (Five Stag Bay, or Baie de Cinq Cerfs) is a natural bay on the island of Newfoundland in the province of Newfoundland and Labrador, Canada.

References

Bays of Newfoundland and Labrador